Jan Charisius (30 September 1926 – 3 July 2008) was a Dutch speed skater. He competed in the men's 500 metres event at the 1952 Winter Olympics.

References

1926 births
2008 deaths
Dutch male speed skaters
Olympic speed skaters of the Netherlands
Speed skaters at the 1952 Winter Olympics
Sportspeople from Leeuwarden